Massimo Drisaldi is an Italian former tennis player.

Biography
He won four medals at the Summer Universiade.

Achievements

References

External links
  Athlete profile at FISO web site

Year of birth missing (living people)
Living people
Italian male tennis players
Universiade medalists in tennis
Universiade gold medalists for Italy
Universiade bronze medalists for Italy
Medalists at the 1959 Summer Universiade
Medalists at the 1961 Summer Universiade
20th-century Italian people